, a.k.a. The Pitfall and Kashi To Kodomo, is a 1962 Japanese film directed by Hiroshi Teshigahara, written by Kōbō Abe. It was Teshigahara's first feature, and the first of his four film collaborations with Abe, the others being Woman in the Dunes, The Face of Another and The Man Without a Map. Unlike the others, which are based on novels by Abe, Pitfall was originally a television play called Purgatory (Rengoku). The film has been included in The Criterion Collection.

Plot
Pitfall is set against the background of labour relations in the Japanese mining industry, but the film owes as much to surrealism as it does to "socially aware" drama. The mine in the film is divided into two pits, the old one and the new one, each represented by a different trade union faction. A mysterious man in white, whose identity we never learn,  murders an unemployed miner who bears an uncanny resemblance to the union leader at the old pit and bribes the only witness to frame the union leader of the new pit. The two union leaders go to the murder scene to investigate only to come across the body of the witness, who has subsequently been killed by the man in white. They blame one another and begin a fight which ends in the deaths of both. The film ends with the man in white observing them before riding off on his motorcycle, satisfied his mission is complete. Beyond this realistic plot, Pitfall shows us the realm of the dead as well as the living, as the ghosts of the victims look on, powerless to intervene in events and bring the truth to light.

Cast 
Hisashi Igawa - Miner / Otsuka
Sumie Sasaki - Shopkeeper
Sen Yano - Toyama
Hideo Kanze - Policeman
Kunie Tanaka - Man in white suit
Kei Satō - Reporter

Production
The film's focus on the exploitation of coal miners was likely influenced by Teshigahara and Abe's political leanings, and their sympathy with the Tokyo demonstrations in 1960 against Anpo.

The film was shot in Kyūshū, and incorporates stock footage of mining disasters and starvation that had afflicted the area. Many of the visual devices and themes are similar to the contemporaneous work of Shōhei Imamura, whose 1959 film My Second Brother also featured Kyūshū coal miners.

Teshigahara often disagreed with his film crew, and fired two assistant directors who did not wish to include the scene in which the policeman rapes the shopkeeper.

Release
Pitfall was first distributed by Japan Art Theatre Guild (ATG) on a limited release on July 1, 1962. ATG had only began distributing films on April 20, 1962.

The film then appeared to be acquired by Toho for wider release on June 6, 1964. The film was released in the United States in 1964 through Toho International.

References

Booklet and commentary by Tony Rayns to the Eureka Masters of Cinema DVD edition.

External links
 
 
 Pitfall at Strictly Film School
 Pitfall at the Japanese Movie Database 
Pitfall: Outdoor Miner an essay by Howard Hampton at the Criterion Collection

1962 films
1962 drama films
1960s avant-garde and experimental films
Japanese avant-garde and experimental films
Japanese drama films
1960s Japanese-language films
Japanese black-and-white films
Films about the labor movement
Films directed by Hiroshi Teshigahara
Toho films
1960s Japanese films